Léon Cauvy (12 January 1874, Montpellier - 3 January 1933, Algiers) was a French Orientalist painter.

Biography 
He began his studies in 1890 at the local School of Fine Arts; winning several awards for his sketches and ink wash paintings, although his interests soon turned to decorative work. Later, he went to Paris and spent some time studying with Albert Maignan at the École des Beaux-arts.  

He participated in the Salon from 1901 to 1903. At the Salon of 1907, he was awarded third place. That same year, he and Paul Jouve became the first winners of the Prix Abd-el-Tif. One of the benefits of the prize was a year's stay at the Villa Abd-el-Tif in Algiers.

He was already thirty-years old and had a promising career in France, but immediately became enamored of North Africa. He exhibited fifty of his paintings at an Orientalist exhibition in Paris in 1909 and, pleased with their reception, decided to remain in Algeria.

In 1925, he was placed in charge of decorating the Algerian Pavilion at the International Exhibition of Modern Decorative and Industrial Arts. After the exhibition, his works were  moved to the "Palais d’Été"; official home and headquarters for the French admirals in Algiers (A building that would later be the scene for the assassination of François Darlan).

Five years later, he designed the poster commemorating one-hundred years of French rule in Algeria. Thirty-thousand copies were made and distributed worldwide. This was followed by several more poster designs, for shipping companies in the tourist trade.

In 1932, for his last major work, he created a large canvas depicting the Ouled Naïls that was shown at the Salon of the Société des Artistes Français. Since 1990, it has been on display at the Musée des Années Trente. Overall, he concentrated on scenes of daily life as opposed to the more "exotic" aspects of Arab culture. Many of his paintings have the appearance of tapestries.

Selected paintings

See also
 List of Orientalist artists
 Orientalism

References

Further reading 
Marion Vidal-Bué: Alger et ses peintres 1830-1960, éd. Paris-Méditerranée, 2000

External links

ArtNet: More works by Cauvy.
Cauvy from "Le Patrimoine en Peril" @ OverBlog.

1874 births
1933 deaths
20th-century French painters
20th-century French male artists
Orientalist painters
French people in French Algeria
École des Beaux-Arts
Artists from Montpellier